During the 2010–11 French football season, AS Monaco competed in Ligue 1.

First-team squad
Squad at end of season

Out on loan

Transfers

Summer

In:

Out:

Winter

In:

Out:

Competitions

Ligue 1

League table

Results summary

Results by round

Results

Coupe de la Ligue

Coupe de France

Squad statistics

Appearances and goals

|-
|colspan="14"|Players away from Monaco on loan:

|-
|colspan="14"|Players who appeared for Monaco no longer at the club:

|}

Top scorers

Disciplinary record

Notes and references

Notes

References

External links
2010-11 AS Monaco FC season at Soccerway

AS Monaco FC seasons
Monaco
AS Monaco
AS Monaco